The Professional Amigos of Comic Art Society (P.A.C.A.S. or PACAS, the Spanish word "pacas" meaning "bundle of goods") is a defunct American non-profit organization formed by several independent comic book and cartoon creators in 1995. 

The group disbanded a few years after its inception.

Membership
Original founders include creators Richard Dominguez, Carlos Saldaña, Jose Martinez, and Fernando Rodriguez. The majority of members lived in California, leaving Dominguez (who lived in Texas) as the self-described "lonely Tejano", but the group was also associated with Oscar Loya and the ¡Ka-Boom! Estudio group from Mexico.

Notable members
Richard Dominguez (co-founder, El Gato Negro)
Carlos Saldaña (co-founder, Burrito: Jack of All Trades)
Jose Martinez (co-founder, The Chosen)
Fernando Rodriguez (co-founder, Aztec of the City)
Javier Hernandez (El Muerto: The Aztec Zombie)
Rafael Navarro (Sonambulo)
Michael S. Moore
Oscar González Loyo & ¡Ka-Boom! Estudio group

References

External links
Official Site
Official MySpace

Art societies
Arts organizations based in California
Arts organizations established in 1995
1995 establishments in California